Centre Park is a stadium located in Mangere, Auckland, New Zealand. The stadium hosted the 2011 OFC U-20 Championship. It is the home of Northern League side Manukau United.

International matches
Centre Park hosted an international women's friendly football game in 2012 between New Zealand and China.

References

Association football venues in New Zealand
Sports venues in Auckland
Māngere-Ōtāhuhu Local Board Area
Association football in Auckland